Specialist Group Information Services  (SGIS) (known as the 254 (Specialist Group Information Services) Signal Squadron until 1 March 2019) is a British Army Reserve unit which recruits from across the United Kingdom. Currently the headquarters and other elements of its parent unit 13th Signal Regiment are located in Blandford Camp. SGIS became part of 71 (Yeomanry) Signal Regiment in 2019, before moving to the recently re-reformed 13 Signal Regiment in July 2020.

Role
As an outcome of the UK Strategic Defence and Security Review (SDSR) of 2010, the Future Reserves 2020 (FR20) consultation paper Delivering the Nation’s Security Together, published in late 2012 explained how the Army Reserve needed to almost double in size to a trained strength of 30,000.  Particular emphasis was placed upon the requirement for many more specialists, i.e. reservists who are recruited primarily for their professional expertise and skills which are in short supply in the Regular Army.  254 (SGIS) Signal Squadron provides consultancy-style expertise in relation to both Information Management and Information Exploitation in support of the Army and UK Defence as a whole, with their increasing reliance on technology.

References

External links
254 (SGIS) Signal Squadron 
15th Signal Regiment (Information Support)

Squadrons of the Royal Corps of Signals
Information technology consulting firms of the United Kingdom
Army Reserve (United Kingdom)